Strongylognathus is a genus of ants in the subfamily Myrmicinae. Many of its species are endemic to specific regions.

Species

Strongylognathus afer Emery, 1884
Strongylognathus alboini Finzi, 1924
Strongylognathus alpinus Wheeler, 1909
Strongylognathus arnoldii Radchenko, 1985
Strongylognathus caeciliae Forel, 1897
Strongylognathus chelifer Radchenko, 1985
Strongylognathus christophi Emery, 1889
Strongylognathus dalmaticus Baroni Urbani, 1969
Strongylognathus destefanii Emery, 1915
Strongylognathus huberi Forel, 1874
Strongylognathus insularis Baroni Urbani, 1968
Strongylognathus italicus Finzi, 1924
Strongylognathus kabakovi Radchenko & Dubovikov, 2011
Strongylognathus karawajewi Pisarski, 1966
Strongylognathus kervillei Santschi, 1921
Strongylognathus koreanus Pisarski, 1966
Strongylognathus kratochvili Silhavy, 1937
Strongylognathus minutus Radchenko, 1991
Strongylognathus palaestinensis Menozzi, 1933
Strongylognathus pisarskii Poldi, 1994
Strongylognathus potanini Radchenko, 1995
Strongylognathus rehbinderi Forel, 1904
Strongylognathus silvestrii Menozzi, 1936
Strongylognathus testaceus (Schenck, 1852)
Strongylognathus tylonus Wei, Xu & He, 2001

References

External links

 
Ant genera
Taxonomy articles created by Polbot